Zyrafete Gashi (5 October 1955 - 30 July 2013) simply known as Zyra was an Albanian Kosovar comedian.  For over three decades active in the comedy stage, Zyra was known for many of roles. The role she got her pseudonym from was Zyra, an Albanian old-woman with old traditions, Zet’hanja, a police woman, Tetka Dragica, a Serbian Kosovar old-woman from Graçanica complaining about living with Albanians, and many others. She is known for adapting humor and realistic situation in Kosovo.

Although active on TV, Zyra announced that she was moving to Switzerland for a period of 9 months for treatment as she was ill. She came back to her hometown Prishtina a few days before dying. On July 31, 2013 her family confirmed that she had died.  Her death was spread all over the news and had many documentaries about her life being aired just a few days after.

References

1957 births
2013 deaths
Albanian comedians
Actors from Pristina
Women comedians